Petrophila inaurata is a moth in the family Crambidae. It was described by Stoll in 1781. It is found in Suriname.

References

Petrophila
Moths described in 1781